Richard Dawson (16 April 1762 – 3 September 1807) was an Irish Member of Parliament.

Biography
He was the third son of Richard Dawson of Ardee by his wife Anne, daughter of Sir Edward O'Brien, 2nd Baronet, and after his father's death in 1782 he became heir-presumptive to his uncle Thomas Dawson, 1st Baron Dartrey. On 22 May 1784 he married Catherine, daughter of Colonel Arthur Graham of Hockley, county Armagh; they had one son and four daughters. Dawson was elected to the Irish House of Commons for County Monaghan in April 1797 through the influence of his uncle (now Viscount Cremorne), and was named as heir in the special remainder of the barony of Cremorne granted to his uncle in November of that year. He continued to represent Monaghan in the Irish Parliament until the Act of Union, and then sat for the same county in the House of Commons of the United Kingdom until his death in a Dublin Hotel. His son Richard Thomas Dawson succeeded as second Baron Cremorne in 1813.

References

1762 births
1807 deaths
People educated at The Royal School, Armagh
Alumni of Trinity College Dublin
Alumni of Magdalen College, Oxford
Richard
Members of Lincoln's Inn
High Sheriffs of Monaghan
Irish MPs 1790–1797
Irish MPs 1798–1800
UK MPs 1801–1802
UK MPs 1802–1806
UK MPs 1806–1807
UK MPs 1807–1812
Members of the Parliament of the United Kingdom for County Monaghan constituencies (1801–1922)
Members of the Parliament of Ireland (pre-1801) for County Monaghan constituencies